The 2011 Indiana Hoosiers football team represented Indiana University Bloomington during the 2011 NCAA Division I FBS football season in the new Leaders Division of the Big Ten Conference. The 2011 season was the first for new head coach Kevin Wilson, formerly the offensive coordinator at Oklahoma. The Hoosiers played their home games at Memorial Stadium in Bloomington, Indiana. They finished the season 1–11, 0–8 in Big Ten play to place last in the Leaders Division.

Before the season
The Hoosiers entered the season with a new outlook on the football program, after athletic director Fred Glass fired former head coach Bill Lynch and his staff and brought in Oklahoma offensive coordinator Kevin Wilson. To complete his staff, Wilson hired Kevin Johns (Northwestern) and Rod Smith (Michigan) as co-offensive coordinators and Mike Ekeler (Nebraska) and Doug Mallory (New Mexico, LSU) as co-defensive coordinators. The massive turnover in staff lead to a number of changes in team and player personnel. The main position battle heading into the season was at quarterback, with three main candidates (RS sophomores Edward Wright-Baker and Dusty Kiel and true freshman Tre Roberson) were competing to replace senior Ben Chappell, who led the Big Ten in passing the season before.

Recruiting

Schedule

Coaching staff

Roster

References

Indiana
Indiana Hoosiers football seasons
Indiana Hoosiers football